The following are all the albums and singles released by the Danish soft rock band Michael Learns to Rock.

Albums

Studio albums

Compilation albums

Notes

A MLTR was released as Strange Foreign Beauty in the United Kingdom, and as Strange Foreign Beauty - Remixed & More in Asia.
B 19 Love Ballads was released as 19 Love Songs in South Africa and Europe.

Live albums

Extended plays

Singles

Music videos
 "My Blue Angel" (1991)
 "I Still Carry On" (1991)
 "The Actor" (1991)
 "Sleeping Child" (1993)
 "Wild Women" (1993)
 "25 Minutes" (1993)
 "That's Why (You Go Away)" (1995)
 "How Many Hours" (1995)
 "Someday" (1995)
 "Paint My Love" (1996)
 "Breaking My Heart" (1997)
 "Nothing to Lose" (1997)
 "I'm Gonna Be Around" (1997)
 "Something You Should Know" (1997)
 "Strange Foreign Beauty" (1999)
 "Complicated Heart" - '99 Remix (1999)
 "I'm Gonna Be Around" - Radio Version (1999)
 "You Took My Heart Away" (2000)
 "Blue Night" (2000)
 "Take Me to Your Heart" (2004)
 "The Ghost of You" (2004)
 "If You Leave My World" (2004)
 "Without Your Love" (2004)
 "It's Only Love" (2007)
 "I Walk This Road Alone" (2007)
 "Sweetest Surprise" (2008)
 "Any Way You Want It" (2012)
 "The Silent Times" (2014)
 "Call on Love" (2014)
 "I'll Wait for You" (2015)
 "We Shared the Night" (2016)
 "Hold On a Minute" (2018)
 "Hiding Away from Life" (2018)

References

Rock music group discographies
Discographies of Danish artists